Blue October is an English synthpop/pop/dance band based in Essex, formed in 1996 by Glen Wisbey and Barney Miller.

Their first album, Incoming, was released in 1998, on the US record label A Different Drum. Tragedy struck as Miller unexpectedly died soon afterwards. In 2001 a second album, Preaching Lies to the Righteous, was released with Ross Carter replacing Miller as vocalist. A third album, One Day Silver, One Day Gold, was released in 2005 as a third member, Chris Taubert, joined the band.

2008 saw the release of their fourth album, Walk Amongst the Living. Produced by Steve Travell.

In 2010 Carter left the band, who have since recruited Chris Beecham as replacement. June 2010 saw the band start work on their, as yet, untitled fifth studio album.

In addition to the album releases, Blue October have appeared on a number of compilation albums, and the Microsoft Xbox game Dance Dance Revolution Ultra Mix 4.

Band members
 Chris Beecham – vocals
 Glen Wisbey – keyboards
 Chris Taubert – keyboards
 Nic Johnston – guitars

Touring member
 Bob Malkowski – drums

Discography

Albums

Singles

 1 Digital single

References

English dance music groups
English alternative rock groups
English synth-pop groups
Musical groups established in 1995